Trumai is an endangered language isolate of Brazil. Most Trumai are fluent in languages of wider communication, and children are not learning it well.

Background 
Trumai is a language spoken by the indigenous community of the same name located in the Xingu reserve along the Upper Xingu River in central Brazil.  Murphy and Quain reported that there were only 25 people remaining in the Trumai community.  Fortunately, this has since increased to 94 as of 1997, of which 51 people spoke the Trumai language.  In the International Encyclopedia of Linguistics, Grimes observes that there are 78 speakers as of 2003.  Due to the popularity of speaking Portuguese among the local population, Trumai is considered an extremely endangered language because the children are not learning to speak it as a first language.

The Trumai people first entered the Upper Xingu region sometime in the early 19th century after being driven away from southeastern Brazil by the Xavante people.  The first contact the Trumai had with a white person was in 1884 when Karl von den Steinen explored the Upper Xingu region.  He observed the differences between Trumai culture and other Xingu cultures due to the Trumai's relocation. In the fifty years or so that followed Von den Steinem's first visit to the Trumai, there is little documentation of the community because researchers who visited the Xingu region preferred visiting and studying other indigenous cultures instead.

In the time between the Trumai's first arrival in the upper Xingu and Von den Steinen's first contact with them, they were continuously being attacked by the native communities in the region, including the Suyá and Ikpeng. Following a period of contacts from researchers, including Buell Quain in 1938, the Trumai moved to a new territory again, this time because of a flu and measles epidemic.  After recovering from this, the subsequent population increase led to the emergence of more Trumai villages in the Upper Xingu region, while their former territories have since become occupied by other communities.

Despite being surrounded by a variety of different languages that belong to the four major stocks of Brazilian indigenous languages (Tupi, Arawak, Cariban, and Ge), Trumai is an isolated language.  There is speculation that Trumai belongs to the Equatorial language stock, in which case it is still very far removed from other languages and families belonging here.

Initial research done on the Trumai was included in an overall study of the cultures of the Xingu region, which was performed through surveys focussing on "material culture".  Quain was the first researcher to focus on the Trumai culture specifically, however, this was an anthropological study, not linguistic.  In the preface to her thesis "A Reference Grammar of Trumaí", Guirardello states that Monod-Becquelin was the first person to conduct descriptive studies on the Trumai language, in which she focused on aspects of the language such as ergativity and phonological transcriptions.  Monod-Becquelin's early work was followed by Greenberg's research, which includes his aforementioned proposal that Trumai, instead of being a completely isolated language, belongs to the Equatorial stock.

Guirardello's "A Reference Grammar of Trumai" is the first proper description of Trumai grammar, which Guirardello composed with the intention of it becoming an aid for future research papers on the language.  Since then, research on the Trumai language has increased, leading to studies of various aspects of the language.  Monod-Becquelin has continued her research by investigating the use of transitive verbs in Trumai. Guirardello's work has also included studies into Trumai's ergativity, focussing on the ergative-absolutive patterns in its morphology and the complexity of its syntax due to the nominative-accusative patterns also present.

Trumai was one of the 24 indigenous languages studied in South America as part of a series of documentation projects conducted by DoBeS (Documenting Endangered Languages).  DoBeS is one of the many language documentation organizations operating in Brazil, and is funded by the Volkswagen Foundation.

The Trumai culture has also been the topic of anthropological studies.  The first was done by Buell Quain, who spent four months with the Trumai and gathered information on many aspects of the culture and community.  More recently, De Vienne has conducted ethnographic studies on Trumai focussing on language and communication in the community, such as joking and ritual singing traditions.

Language contact
Jolkesky (2016) notes that there are lexical similarities with the Macro-Mataguayo-Guaykuru, Tupi, and Mochika language families due to contact.

Similarities with the Macro-Mataguayo-Guaykuru languages and Tupi-Guarani languages indicate that Trumai had originated in the Paraguay River basin. The Trumai had only arrived in the Upper Xingu basin via the Culuene River during the 19th century (Villas Bôas & Villas Bôas 1970:27).

Grammar

Phonology 

This inventory is atypical of Amazonian languages in its ejective consonants, the lateral fricative , and the alveolar–dental distinction. Guirardello, who specializes on Trumai, has presented varied inventories of these phonemes: Guirardello (1999a) lists /t̪ t̪' ts ts' s/ as dental, and /t t' d n l ɬ ɾ/ as alveolar; whereas Guirardello (1999b) lists only /t/ and /t'/ as alveolar. Younger speakers do not make the ejective distinction.

Syllable structure is maximally CVC, and stress always falls on the final syllable of a word.

Morphology 
The morphological aspects of Trumai as covered in Guirardello's grammar of the language include the parts of speech: nouns, verbs, and auxiliaries.  Under nouns, she investigates the effect of adjectives, plurality in the language, and count versus mass nouns, among others. Under verbs, she focuses on causality, negation, intensity, and imperativity in verb particles. And under auxiliaries, she discusses body posture, mood and aspect, and directional auxiliaries.  Chapter 5 explores further analyses of each of these aspects of the parts of speech in terms of "Simple Declarative Clauses".

Pronouns in Trumai are distinguished by person, gender, number, and listener inclusion/exclusion in the first-person plural pronoun.  Like in English, gender is only seen in the third-person singular pronoun, while number is categorized as singular, dual, and plural (whereas English only has singular and plural).  They are also affected by the type of Noun Phrase (henceforth "NP") they appear in (absolutive, ergative, or dative), which are distinguished by suffix insertion.  The following are tables of the Trumai personal pronouns with examples included for the absolutive case:

Dual number is indicated by the suffix -a, and plural by -wan. Masculine and feminine are distinguished in the 3rd person. Alienable possession is indicated by the suffix -kte or -kate on the possessor ( 'Kumaru's spoon'), and inalienable possession by juxtaposition ( 'the girl's head',  'my head'). Suffixes are used to mark ergative (-ts for 1sg, otherwise -ek/-ak), dative, locative, allative, comitative, and instrumental case.

One interesting phenomena in Trumai morphology is the use of particles in the language. Guirardello first discusses them as a form of identifying tense in lieu of the tense-aspect-mood affixes used in English. In a sentence, these particles appear as so:

ka_in:

chï_in:

As a whole, particles in Trumai are defined as a verb modifier that is not an adverb or auxiliary instead of being placed in a class of its own.  There are four classes of particles in Trumai: Intensity, Negation, Causative, and Intensity.  These modifiers fall under the 'particle' label because of their characteristics which differentiate them from auxiliaries. For example, while auxiliaries can only modify verbs, Intensity and Negation particles can also modify adverbs and quantifiers.

The use of auxiliaries in Trumai is also very fascinating.  In the language, they are defined as verb modifiers "associated with the domain of aspect, mood, and spatial orientation (this last domain is subdivided into body posture of the entity performing the event and directionality of the event being performed)".  Here are some examples of each of these auxiliaries used in sentences:

Aspect/Mood:

Body Posture:

Directionals:

Guirardello makes a point of noting the significant differences between auxiliaries and verbs in Trumai: there is no independent argument structure, no lexical content, some experience phonological reduction, and they form a closed class.  Their syntactic position is restricted to following a verb in the VP, which distinguishes them from adverbs, which hold a more flexible position in sentences.  Apart from appearing inside the VP following the Verb, a property of some auxiliaries is that "they can bear the 3Abs enclitic –n/-e".

Syntax

Ergative-Absolutive Language Structure 
Trumai is a language with ergative-absolutive case assignment and therefore has three argument types: absolutive, ergative, and dative.  The ergative-absolutive language system is described as that "in which a subject in an intransitive construction is realized in the same way as a patient or object in a transitive construction, and is thus distinguished from the subject or agent in the transitive".  It is "manifested through case-marking, verb-marking, and word order".

Dative case is used for verbs such as 'eat', 'see', and 'talk with'. There are two verbs for 'kill', one, -fa, which takes a dative, and one, which takes the ergative. Constituent order is basically ergative-absolutive-verb-dative (SV, SVB, AOV, AOVB).

In noun phrases (including pronouns), the grammatical case is marked by an enclitic. For example, an ergative NP would end in either –ek or –k. Case marking using enclitics also occurs for Dative, Locative, and Genitive cases. In the case of personal pronouns, the first person singular pronoun also allows the enclitic –ts.

An interesting phenomenon in Trumai syntax is the NP morpheme  because of its lack of a clear function. It always appears phrase-final, as  when only the noun itself is included in the phrase, but as  when pluralizers or other lexical items are also included. However, despite this rule, there are still occasions where  appears in an NP with a lexical item.  When it is present in Ergative and Dative sentences, the enclitics for each case are still added to the end of the NP:

Reduced form:

No lexical item:

Ergative/Dative:

For verb phrases in Trumai, case marking provides four verb categories: Intransitive, Transitive, Extended Intransitive, and Extended Transitive, where Intransitive verbs can have Absolutive case, Transtive verbs have Absolutive and Ergative case, and the Extended categories also have Dative case on top of this.  Guirardello labels arguments as S, A, O, and DAT for case-marking instead of terms such as agent and patient.

Guirardello observed three types of clauses in Trumai sentences. Intransitive clauses attach the case marking /-ø/ to the S noun phrase or attach the third person enclitic –n/-e to the end of the verb phrase. Similarly to Intransitive clauses, the third person enclitic is added to the VP when A is absent. In Ditransitive clauses, the same marking occurs for A and O that we see in Transitive clauses. The DAT argument is marked by either , -ki, or  "depending on the characteristics of the head of the NP". No marking is attached to the VP when DAT is absent from the sentence. These clauses are proof of the Ergative-Absolutive argument of Trumai, as we see S and O undergo the same marking, while A is treated differently. In sentences, they would appear as follows:

Intransitive:

Transitive:

Ditransitive:

The Absolutive argument is obligatory and therefore occurs in all clause types.  Its case-marking is –ø or it has none at all and its syntactic placement is within the VP, before the verb (Guirardello is not clear as to whether it appears immediately before the verb or if other lexical items can be placed between them).

Its syntactic placement is preceding the VP. While there are certain scenarios where it can be absent from a sentence that mainly occurs when there is discourse continuity. If it occurs without this, then the sentence has passive or middle voice.

Like the Ergative argument, it occurs before and outside of the VP. It is only obligatory in Extended clauses, where it is the main argument of the verb.

Trumai's causative construction uses the particle , which appears after the verb and can modify it.  For Intransitive and Extended Transitive verbs, the causee is marked as Absolutive, while the causer is marked as Ergative. While this makes it similar to a simple Transitive clause, the difference is that the Absolutive enclitic is marked on the particle instead of the verb.  For Transitive verbs, both the causee and causer are marked Ergative:

Semantics

Quantifiers 
In Trumai, quantifiers appear before the noun they modify.  For numerals, while the language includes the names for 1–10, most often only numbers 1–5 are spoken:

'1'          '2'            '3' 

'4'                              '5'            

     Friend   friend-Gen   group               3Masc  hand finger-Loc

Other quantifier words (ex. 'few', 'many', etc.) change depending on whether they appear before count or mass nouns.  They also vary from speaker to speaker, as in the case of "few" versus "a little", some speakers can distinguish the two based on how they appear before count vs. non-count words, while others cannot except for "high quantities".  When they are distinguished, the quantifiers used by some speakers are:

While most speakers, who cannot distinguish between count and mass nouns for small quantities, say:

Aside from the above forms, there is an alternate form to describe small quantities:  'few', which is meant to describe a small portion of an object.  Here are some examples for each type of the above quantifiers:

Many/a lot:     

(count)           many Foc/Tens  fish   YI

'There are many fish.' (or: 'The fish are many/big in quantity.')

Many/a lot:     

(mass)            a.lot  Foc/Tens water YI

'There is a lot of water.' (or: 'The water is big in quantity.')

Few/a little:                

(some speakers)       many  Neg Foc/Tens  fish   YI

'There are a few fish.' (or: 'The fish are not many.')

Few/a little:                

(most speakers)         a.lot  Neg Foc/Tens  fish   YI

'There are a few fish.' (or: 'The fish are not many.')

Few:  

          clay.pan  small

'small clay.pan.'

Just as is seen above where few/a little are formed as many/a lot plus a negation, there is no word for none, so negation is added in its place as well:

work    Desid Neg  man PL   YI

'No man wants to work.' (lit: 'The men do not want to work.')

Quantifiers (numeral and otherwise) can also appear as a clause predicate or a focussed unit, in which they appear at the beginning of a sentence and are followed by a Focus/Tense particle.

Person plays a crucial role in what NP a quantifier is assigned to. Guirardello explains that in a sentence where there is both first- and third-person nouns/pronouns, it is clear that the quantifier is attached to the third-person.  This is not as clear when there are two third-person NPs in a sentence.  In order to understand which NP the quantifier is modifying in this scenario, one must look at what kinds of NPs are in the clause with the quantifier and if it is also being modified by a pluralizer.

Vocabulary
Loukotka (1968) lists the following basic vocabulary items for Trumai.

{| class="wikitable sortable"
! gloss !! Trumai
|-
| 'one' || 
|-
| 'two' || 
|-
| 'three' || 
|-
| 'head' || 
|-
| 'ear' || 
|-
| 'tooth' || 
|-
| 'hand' || 
|-
| 'woman' || 
|-
| 'water' || 
|-
| 'fire' || 
|-
| 'stone' || 
|-
| 'maize' || 
|-
| 'tapir' || 
|}

References

External links
Trumai (Intercontinental Dictionary Series)

Language isolates of South America
Endangered indigenous languages of the Americas
Endangered language isolates
Languages of Xingu Indigenous Park